Tulista minima is a species of succulent plant, from the far south of the Western Cape, South Africa. 

It was formerly classed in the genus Haworthia, as Haworthia minima. However this was not the correct name, as the name Haworthia minor in fact had priority. When the species was transferred to the new genus Tulista, a combination was first published for Tulista minima, which was likewise invalid. A new combination was therefore needed for Tulista minor, which was accordingly published in 2018.

Description

It is a small evergreen succulent plant, with hard, fleshy blue-green leaves that are covered in white tubercles. It offsets readily and can form clumps.

It produces white flowers with pink tips in the summer (November to December).

It is a variable species, with different populations differing in the leaf shape, colour, growth form and tubercles. Popular varieties include T. minima var. poellnitziana, as well as the opalina and obrata varieties.

Naming and taxonomy

It was formerly placed in the genus Haworthia, along with the other large species (H. pumila, H. kingiana and H. marginata) in the "Robustipedunculares" subgenus. Following recent phylogenetic studies, it has been shown that these four species in fact constitute a distinct out-group, separate from other haworthias. They have therefore been classed as a separate genus, Tulista.

, the World Checklist of Selected Plant Families does not accept the name Tulista minima. Its synonymy for the earlier combination Haworthia minima regards Haworthia minor as the correct name. On this basis the species should not be transferred to Tulista using the specific epithet minima, but rather as Tulista minor. Haworthia opalina has been treated as either part of Haworthia minima or, less often, as a separate species. In the second case, on transfer to Tulista, T. opalina is recognized in addition to T. minima.

The name "minima" simply means "smaller" as it is not as large as its closest relatives, such as "Tulista pumila". In some old records it is also occasionally classed as Haworthia margaritifera. Two main varieties are recognised: the main variety minima, and the rarer variety in the far north-west of its range, poellnitziana (Uitewaal), which has longer slender leaves and grows in gravelly fynbos vegetation.

Distribution
The natural distribution of this species is in the far southern part of the Western Cape, South Africa. Its range extends from Botrivier and Agulhas, eastwards to Brandrivier, Herbertsdale and Hartenbos. 

Its habitat is usually coastal Renosterveld vegetation.

It often occurs alongside other Tulista species and is known naturally to hybridise with Tulista marginata where the two species overlap near Heidelberg.

Cultivation
It is a very easy plant in cultivation, but is nonetheless very rarely grown. It requires well-drained soil, and tolerates both semi-shade and sun. It can be grown from seed, but it offsets and subdivides naturally so it can also be propagated simply by dividing the resulting clump.

References

External links
 

minor
Endemic flora of South Africa
Flora of the Cape Provinces
Renosterveld